Busby is a small hamlet in central Alberta, Canada within Westlock County.

History 
Busby was settled by Americans and was named Independence when the post office opened in 1903. In 1915, the Edmonton, Dunvegan and British Columbia Railway arrived and the hamlet's name was changed to Busby.

Demographics 

See also 
List of communities in Alberta
List of designated places in Alberta
List of hamlets in Alberta

References 

Hamlets in Alberta
Designated places in Alberta
Westlock County